A civil parish is a country subdivision, forming the lowest unit of local government in England. There are 333 civil parishes in the ceremonial county of Cheshire, most of the county being parished. Cheshire East unitary authority is entirely parished. At the 2001 census, there were 565,259 people living in 332 parishes, accounting for 57.5 per cent of the county's population.

History

Parishes arose from Church of England divisions, and were originally purely ecclesiastical divisions.  Over time they acquired civil administration powers.

The Highways Act 1555 made parishes responsible for the upkeep of roads. Every adult inhabitant of the parish was obliged to work four days a year on the roads, providing their own tools, carts and horses; the work was overseen by an unpaid local appointee, the Surveyor of Highways.

The poor were looked after by the monasteries, until their dissolution. In 1572, magistrates were given power to 'survey the poor' and impose taxes for their relief.  This system was made more formal by the Poor Law Act 1601, which made parishes responsible for administering the Poor Law; overseers were appointed to charge a rate to support the poor of the parish.  The 19th century saw an increase in the responsibility of parishes, although the Poor Law powers were transferred to Poor Law Unions.  The Public Health Act 1872 grouped parishes into Rural Sanitary Districts, based on the Poor Law Unions; these subsequently formed the basis for Rural Districts.

Parishes were run by vestries, meeting annually to appoint officials, and were generally identical to ecclesiastical parishes, although some townships in large parishes administered the Poor Law themselves; under the Divided Parishes and Poor Law Amendment Act 1882, all extra-parochial areas and townships that levied a separate rate became independent civil parishes.

Civil parishes in their modern sense date from the Local Government Act 1894, which abolished vestries; established elected parish councils in all rural parishes with more than 300 electors; grouped rural parishes into Rural Districts; and aligned parish boundaries with county and borough boundaries.  Urban civil parishes continued to exist, and were generally coterminous with the Urban District, Municipal Borough or County Borough in which they were situated; many large towns contained a number of parishes, and these were usually merged into one.  Parish councils were not formed in urban areas, and the only function of the parish was to elect guardians to Poor Law Unions; with the abolition of the Poor Law system in 1930 the parishes had only a nominal existence.

The Local Government Act 1972 retained civil parishes in rural areas, and many former Urban Districts and Municipal Boroughs that were being abolished, were replaced by new successor parishes; urban areas that were considered too large to be single parishes became unparished areas.

The current position

Recent governments have encouraged the formation of town and parish councils in unparished areas, and the Local Government and Rating Act 1997 gave local residents the right to demand the creation of a new civil parish.

A parish council can become a town council unilaterally, simply by resolution; and a civil parish can also gain city status, but only if that is granted by the Crown.  The chairman of a town or city council is called a mayor.  The Local Government and Public Involvement in Health Act 2007 introduced alternative names: a parish council can now choose to be called a community; village; or neighbourhood council.

List of civil parishes and unparished areas

Cheshire West and Chester
The former Chester County Borough and parts of the former Ellesmere Port Municipal Borough and Neston Urban District are unparished.
 Acton Bridge
 Agden
 Aldersey
 Aldford and Saighton
 Allostock
 Alvanley
 Anderton with Marbury
 Antrobus
 Ashton Hayes and Horton-cum-Peel
 Aston
 Bache
 Backford
 Barnton
 Barrow
 Barton
 Beeston
 Bostock
 Broxton
 Burwardsley
 Byley
 Capenhurst
 Carden
 Chester Castle
 Chidlow
 Chorlton
 Chowley
 Christleton
 Churton
 Clotton Hoofield
 Clutton
 Coddington
 Comberbach
 Croughton
 Crowton
 Cuddington
 Cuddington
 Darnhall
 Davenham
 Delamere and Oakmere
 Dodleston
 Duckington
 Duddon and Burton
 Dunham-on-the-Hill and Hapsford
 Dutton
 Eaton and Eccleston
 Elton
 Farndon
 Frodsham
 Golborne David
 Great Boughton
 Great Budworth
 Guilden Sutton
 Handley
 Hargrave and Huxley
 Hartford
 Harthill
 Helsby
 Huntington
 Ince
 Kelsall
 Kingsley
 Kingsmead
 Lach Dennis
 Lea-by-Backford
 Ledsham
 Little Budworth
 Little Leigh
 Little Stanney
 Littleton
 Lostock Gralam
 Malpas
 Manley
 Marston
 Mickle Trafford and District
 Mollington
 Moston
 Mouldsworth
 Moulton
 Neston
 Nether Peover
 No Man's Heath and District
 Norley
 Northwich
 Poulton and Pulford
 Puddington
 Rowton
 Rudheath
 Rushton
 Saughall and Shotwick Park
 Shocklach Oviatt and District
 Sproston
 Stanthorne and Wimboldsley
 Stoak
 Stretton
 Sutton Weaver
 Tarporley
 Tarvin
 Tattenhall and District
 Thornton-le-Moors
 Threapwood
 Tilston
 Tiverton and Tilstone Fearnall
 Tushingham-cum-Grindley, Macefen and Bradley
 Upton-by-Chester
 Utkinton and Cotebrook
 Waverton
 Weaverham
 Wervin
 Whitegate and Marton
 Whitley
 Wigland
 Willington
 Wincham
 Winsford

See also

 List of civil parishes in England

References

External links
 Office for National Statistics : Geographical Area Listings
 Cheshire East Council : Clerks of Town Councils, Parish Councils and Parish Meetings
 Cheshire West and Chester Council : Contact Details for Local Council Clerks
 Halton Borough Council : Parish Councils
 Warrington Borough Council : Parish and Town Councils

 
Civil parishes
Cheshire